Ambrose J. Russell (October 15, 1857 – March 6, 1938) was an architect in Tacoma, Washington. He was Scottish but born to parents on mission in the East Indies, in the town of Trivandram, India. He was trained in Paris at the Ecole des Beaux Arts where he was a classmate of Bernard Maybeck.

Russell trained in the United States with 19th-century Boston architect Henry Hobson Richardson. Henry Rhodes had Russell and Frederick Heath design and build a house in 1901.

In the Pacific Northwest Everett Phipps Babcock worked with him. Russell's projects included the Washington Governor's Mansion in Olympia and the William Ross Rust House built for smelter magnate William Rust, costing $122,500. He also designed the Temple Theater, Rust Building, Perkins Building, Tacoma's armory and "many of the city's large mansions" including the Rhodes mansion and the Gower Mansion on E Street.

Admiral James Sargent Russell was his son.

References

1857 births
1938 deaths
People of the Dutch East Indies
American architects
American alumni of the École des Beaux-Arts